Dannielle Jade Khan (born 1 September 1995) is an English racing cyclist, who currently rides for British amateur team Bianchi Hunt Morvelo. She won the sprint and 500m TT events at the Juniors world championships in 2013, as well as the silver medal in the Keirin.

Career
Born in Solihull, Khan started her sporting life as a short track speed skater, and was encouraged to try cycling as part off her off season conditioning. She quickly found success on the velodrome and became a member of British Cycling's Olympic Development Programme in 2012.

In August 2013, at the Sir Chris Hoy Velodrome in Glasgow, Khan represented Britain at the UCI Juniors Track World Championships. She was featured in the documentary "Bicycle" with her family.

In January 2016 Khan was announced as a member of Team Breeze, British Cycling's women's development squad.

In October 2016 Khan traveled to Paris to race in her first U23 European Track Championships where her and the other team pursuit girls got a bronze medal.

Personal life
Khan's younger sister Daisy, is also a cyclist.

Major results

2011
 National Youth Track Championships
1st  Sprint
1st  500m time trial
3rd Scratch
2012
 National Junior Track Championships
1st  Sprint
3rd 500m time trial
3rd Scratch
 2nd Team sprint, UEC European Junior Track Championships (with Lucy Garner)
 3rd 500m time trial, National Track Championships
2013
 UCI Juniors Track World Championships
1st  Sprint
1st  500m time trial
2nd Keirin
 National Junior Track Championships
1st  Sprint
3rd 500m time trial
 1st Team sprint, Ghent International Junior Track Meeting (with Hannah Blount)
 Revolution Series
1st Keirin – Round 1, Manchester
2nd Sprint – Round 2, Glasgow
3rd Sprint – Round 1, Manchester
 3rd 500m time trial, National Track Championships
2014
 National Track Championships
1st  Team sprint (with Jessica Varnish)
2nd Keirin
 Revolution Series
1st Keirin – Round 3, Manchester 
2nd Sprint – Round 3, Manchester
3rd Keirin – Round 4, Manchester
 2nd Sprint, Dudenhofen
 Oberhausen
3rd Keirin
3rd Sprint
 3rd Team sprint, 2013–14 UCI Track Cycling World Cup, Guadalajara (with Victoria Williamson)
2015
 2nd Keirin, Fastest Man on Wheels
 Revolution Series – Round 1, Derby
3rd Keirin
3rd 500m time trial
2016
 1st  Team pursuit, UEC European Track Championships
 UEC European Under-23 Track Championships
1st  Team pursuit
3rd  Scratch
 1st Team pursuit, 2016–17 UCI Track Cycling World Cup, Glasgow
 3rd Scratch, Revolution – Round 1, Manchester

References

External links
 
 

1995 births
Living people
Sportspeople from Solihull
English female cyclists
English track cyclists
Cyclists at the 2014 Commonwealth Games
Commonwealth Games competitors for England